Fessia is a genus of bulbous flowering plants in the family Asparagaceae, subfamily Scilloideae (also treated as the family Hyacinthaceae). It is distributed from Iran to Central Asia and Pakistan.

Description

Species of Fessia grow from bulbs, which are covered by a gray or black tunic, purple inside. Each bulb produces one or more flower stems (scapes) bearing whitish to blue or violet flowers. The stamens have pale blue anthers. The black seeds are globe or drop shaped.

A number of species of Fessia, often under their earlier names in the genus Scilla, are grown by gardeners specializing in ornamental bulbous plants; they are hardy but some need a dry period in summer. F. puschkinioides (syn. Scilla puchkinioides) is described as "an easy to grow hardy species".

Systematics

The genus Fessia was created by Franz Speta in 1998. All the species were previously included in a more broadly defined genus Scilla. The genus is placed in the tribe Hyacintheae (or the subfamily Hyacinthoideae by those who use the family Hyacinthaceae).

Species

, the World Checklist of Selected Plant Families recognized 11 species:

Fessia bisotunensis (Speta) Speta
Fessia furseorum (Meikle) Speta
Fessia gorganica (Speta) Speta
Fessia greilhuberi (Speta) Speta
Fessia hohenackeri (Fisch. & C.A.Mey.) Speta
Fessia khorassanica (Meikle) Speta
Fessia parwanica (Speta) Speta
Fessia purpurea (Griff.) Speta
Fessia puschkinioides (Regel) Speta
Fessia raewskiana (Regel) Speta
Fessia vvedenskyi (Pazij) Speta

References

Asparagaceae genera
Scilloideae